Dame Alison Margaret Holst  (née Payne, born 1938) is a best-selling New Zealand food writer and television celebrity chef.

Biography
Holst was born in Dunedin, and graduated from the University of Otago, then a constituent college of the University of New Zealand, with a Bachelor of Home Science and subsequently spent a year at Teachers' College. She then began lecturing in the Foods Department at the School of Home Science before starting her television career. Her first television programme premiered in 1965. The following year she published her first cookbook. Since then (as of 2010) her cookbooks have collectively sold more than four and a half million copies of 100 titles, and she has appeared on numerous other television and radio shows as well as writing newspaper columns and magazine articles.

Since 1990 she has co-written several cookbooks with her son, Simon Holst. In November 2010 Holst appeared on Radio New Zealand's afternoon programme to deny rumours that she had been asked to be the next governor-general.

Holst has described the style of food in most of her books as 'everyday food' and the recipes are generally written for home cooks and intended to be easy and reasonably cheap to make, as well as nutritious. Since 1994 she has marketed a brand of bulk wholefoods under the name Alison's Pantry through the Foodstuffs supermarket company.

Her cook book Meals with the Family from 1967 is held in the collections at New Zealand’s national museum Te Papa Tongarewa.

Honours
In the 1983 Queen's Birthday Honours, Holst was awarded the Queen's Service Medal for public services. In the 1987 New Year Honours, she was appointed a Commander of the Order of the British Empire, for services to home science. In 1997, the University of Otago conferred Holst with an honorary Doctor of Science degree.

In the 2011 New Year Honours, Holst was appointed a Dame Companion of the New Zealand Order of Merit, for services to the food industry.

See also
 List of New Zealand television personalities

References

External links
 Alison Holst profile at the University of Otago website

1938 births
Living people
New Zealand food writers
New Zealand television presenters
New Zealand television chefs
University of Otago alumni
Academic staff of the University of Otago
People educated at Otago Girls' High School
Dames Companion of the New Zealand Order of Merit
New Zealand Commanders of the Order of the British Empire
Recipients of the Queen's Service Medal
Women chefs
New Zealand women television presenters